The Pencersæte ("dwellers of the Penk valley") were a tribe or clan in Anglo-Saxon England.  They lived in the valley of the River Penk in the West Midlands, and remained around Penkridge throughout the existence of the Kingdom of Mercia.

An Anglo-Saxon charter of 849 describes an area of Cofton Hackett in the Lickey Hills south of Birmingham as "the boundary of the Tomsæte and the Pencersæte".

References

External links 

  Barbara Yorke, Kings and Kingdoms of early Anglo-Saxon England

Peoples of Anglo-Saxon Mercia
Penkridge